Midi District is a district of the Hajjah Governorate, Yemen. As of 2003, the district had a population of 16,604 inhabitants.

Yemeni Civil War 
The district fell under Hadi government control, then transferred to Saudi Arabia, after the battle of Port Midi in early 2016.

References

Districts of Hajjah Governorate